Aulacophora aculeata is a species of leaf beetle in the genus Aulacophora.

References

Aulacophora
Beetles described in 1908
Taxa named by Julius Weise